Tusoteuthis (meaning "crushed squid") is an extinct genus of large enchoteuthine cephalopod that lived during the Cretaceous. Although often called a squid, it is now thought to be more closely related to modern octopuses. Examination of gladius remains has yielded an estimated mantle length close to or equal to that of the modern giant squid. Fossil remains have been found in parts of the one-time Western Interior Seaway of North America, including Late Cretaceous rocks in Kansas, Colorado, Wyoming, South Dakota, North Dakota, and Manitoba Province. One species, T. longa, is traditionally recognized. In 2019, due to poor preservation of holotype specimen, genus Tusoteuthis is likely to be invalid, and it is considered that later described species are better to include in genus Enchoteuthis instead.

Etymology
American paleontologist William N. Logan did not directly explain the etymology of Tusoteuthis when he named it in 1898. The generic name may be formed from Latin tusus "crushed" (passive participle of Latin tundo "beat, crush") + Greek teuthis "squid", alluding to the typically fragmented condition of the fossil gladius. The gender of the type species name was later corrected to the Latin feminine longa.

Ecology
Tusoteuthis is assumed to have preyed on other cephalopods, fish, and possibly even small marine reptiles.
Tusoteuthis was also preyed on by other animals, especially the many, various predatory fish of the Western Interior Seaway. A fossil of the predatory aulopiform, Cimolichthys nepaholica, was found with the gladius of T. longa in its gullet. The back portion of the gladius was in the stomach region, while the mouth of C. nepaholica had remained opened, suggesting that the fish had died in the middle of swallowing the cephalopod, tail first. Researchers strongly suspect that as the fish was swallowing Tusoteuthis, the head and/or tentacles remained outside the mouth, thus blocking the gills of the fish, and suffocating it as it swallowed its prey.

See also

Cephalopod size
Enchoteuthis

References

External links
Image of fossil Cimolichthys with swallowed T. longa gladius at Oceans of Kansas Paleontology website
Tusoteuthis longa at National Geographic website

Prehistoric cephalopod genera
Octopuses
Coniacian genus first appearances
Campanian genus extinctions
Cretaceous cephalopods of North America
Fossil taxa described in 1898